Iida Dam  is a gravity dam located in Ibaraki Prefecture in Japan. The dam is used for flood control and water supply. The catchment area of the dam is 20.8 km2. The dam impounds about 28  ha of land when full and can store 2440 thousand cubic meters of water. The construction of the dam was started on 1974 and completed in 1991.

See also
List of dams in Japan

References

Dams in Ibaraki Prefecture